Meet the Browns is an American sitcom created and produced by Tyler Perry. The Initial story of the show revolves around Mr. Brown running a senior citizen's home in Decatur, Georgia, with his daughter Cora Simmons. However as the show progresses, this idea is gradually phased out and it becomes a typical family sitcom about a multigenerational clan living under one roof. The show premiered on Wednesday, January 7, 2009 ,and finished its run on November 18, 2011 on TBS. 

It is an adaptation of Perry’s play and film of the same name. The show stars David Mann and Tamela Mann, who starred in the stage play and motion picture. It is also a spin-off of Tyler Perry's House of Payne.

Production history

As season 2 began, Brianne Gould, who played Brianna, was removed from the series for undisclosed reasons. She was replaced by Logan Browning.

In the series, Eddie Walker, one of Will's former friends, who was close to molesting Joaquin, became the first on-screen character to die. He suffered stab wounds, and the surgery done to try to save his life was performed by Will himself. Also, in season 4, Brianna's friend Antonio is killed in a car crash involving texting while driving.

David Mann is the only cast member who appears in every episode.

Mabel 'Madea' Simmons, a recurring character in many of Tyler Perry's works, is an unseen character in this series though she is mentioned many times. Throughout the show's five seasons, she never made an on-camera appearance.

Other unseen characters include Brown's brother and sister-in-law, LB, and Sarah. Both appeared in the stage play and film adaptation of Meet the Browns, but they've never graced the series. However, LB was mentioned once in the backdoor pilot episode which aired as an episode of House of Payne.

In November 2011, TBS suddenly announced that the series finale would be airing since the show had been canceled. November 18, 2011, the last two episodes aired, ending the series after 140 episodes total. 

In February 2020, it was announced that David Mann and Tamela Mann would be reprising their roles in a sequel series titled Tyler Perry's Assisted Living which premiered on September 2, 2020, on BET. Assisted Living, takes place years after the events of Meet the Browns. Brown and Cora act as investors for another retirement home, owned by a family that begs to Brown’s church.

Episodes

Cast and characters

Main characters
The show revolves around the misadventures of the multi-generational Brown family. They live in suburban Atlanta, Georgia. All main cast members are credited only for the episodes in which they appear.

 David Mann as Leroy S. Brown. The show's main protagonist, Mr. Brown, is a church deacon who's very proud of being saved. He has one brother, Larry "L.B." Brown, who is never mentioned in the series but appears in the film, and one sister, Vera. He was married years ago, but his wife died; in the original Tyler Perry plays, they had a daughter, but the character was never mentioned in the films and only shown in the play "Madea's Family Reunion". In "Madea's Class Reunion" he learns that he has a daughter, Cora Simmons, the result of a prom-night escapade with Mabel "Madea" Simmons. Brown isn't over bright (mentally, that is; the word more aptly describes his outrageous dress sense) and he has the wise guy role, making fun of characters like Edna and Reggie; but he is a nice, caring, giving man. He works part-time as a hospital janitor and also as a school enforcement officer (he once beat up a teacher he thought had done something wrong). He is somewhat good at karate, busting out his "Kangaroo" move. His catchphrases include "Stop being nasty!", "What the what?" and "The Devil is a lie!" Running gags involve Brown calling Edna different kinds of animals, making fun of Cora's fiancé' Reggie's weight, and otherwise being open about his dislike for this future son-in-law. In one episode Brown begins to deal with his diabetes. Although he has used many variations of what the middle initial "S" is in his name, in one episode it is revealed his middle name is Sakagawea (pronounced sah-kuh-jeh-wee-uh). In the Madea's Big Happy Family movie, Brown discovers that he is not Cora's father through a paternity test on Maury. The reveal is not brought up in the last season of the show following the movie, but it is brought up again years later in Tyler Perry's Assisted Living, in which Mr. Brown mentions the Maury show events and assumes the Grandpa Vinny character is the father who admits to having an affair with Madea during the time of Cora's conception.
Tamela Mann as Cora Jean Simmons-Brown. Cora is Brown's daughter with Madea. She is a teacher and a praying woman who is very active in her church, but when angered, she shows aspects of her mother, Madea. A childless widow, she later becomes engaged to Reggie Brooks, the football coach at her school who lives with his mother, Thelma (In the play and movie, Cora had 2 adult daughters). "Meet the Candlelight Dinner" reveals that she is allergic to laxatives; the episode "Meet the Attraction" reveals that she's afraid of mannequins and test dummies. In Seasons 3 and 4, she dates Reggie and Gordon and eventually chooses Reggie over Gordon. Her age is never flat-out revealed in the series; she comes closest to blurting it out in "Meet the Big Wedding" ("Mr. Brown, I am" [covers mouth] "years old!"). In the TV series continuity, Cora has known for many years that Mr. Brown is her father, and he often references raising and being there for her; in the Madea's Big Happy Family movie, Madea claims that Mr. Brown has given her $18 in child support: $1-per-year from her birth to age 18. In the episode "Meet the Baby Daddy", a man claimed to be Cora's father, but it was revealed that Mr. Brown was Cora's father after all. But then it was discovered that Cora was not Brown's daughter after appearing on Maury in Madea's Big Happy Family.
 Lamman Rucker as William "Will" Brown, MD. Will is Brown's nephew, a doctor who loves his uncle so much that he provides free medical services to the retirement-home residents. He and his wife Sasha have become adoptive parents to Brianna and Joaquin Ortiz. Will never met his father; Vera, his alcoholic mother, met his father while she was drunk.
 Denise Boutte as Sasha Brown (née Bohem-Brown), RN. Sasha, Will's wife, is a nurse who decides to work for Brown helping to look after the retirement-home residents. Sasha and Will start their family by adopting Brianna and Joaquin Ortiz. In an episode, Sasha becomes pregnant, then miscarries. She is also very good at giving advice.
 Tony Vaughn as Colonel Cleophus Jackson. The Colonel is a former military man who still lives as if he's in the military. His motto is "Shoot now, ask questions later." He's a very disciplined, very formal, and very official man, but underneath that hard exterior is a soft heart. His wife died several years ago, and he's estranged from their only child, daughter Karen. He takes up with Edna Barnes. In Season 3 they moved out of Brown Meadows to a house down the street. He finally weds Edna in Season 5.
 Juanita Jennings as Edna Wright Barnes Grey Foster Jackson. 69-year-old childless widow Edna has always wanted to be a singer but has never pursued this dream. Most of her close friends and relatives have passed. She's extremely in touch with her sexuality—she can relate everything to sex—and acts like the "late 60s" is the new 40. In Season 3, she and her fiancé, the Colonel, moved down the street from Brown Meadows. A running gag involves Brown comparing Edna to various animals. She finally weds the Colonel in Season 5. In the series pilot, she had a crush on Brown, telling him to come in his bed with her plus showing him her full body naked.
 Brianne Gould (Season 1)/Logan Browning (Season 2–5) as Brianna Janae Ortiz-Brown. Brianna is a foster child who comes from a broken home and an unsafe foster environment. At age 16, she knows the foster care system too well. She's very bright but has anger problems that stem from her tragic childhood. The only relationship she nurtures is with her brother Joaquin; she feels like they are alone in the world.
 Gunnar Washington as Joaquin Ortiz-Brown. Joaquin is Brianna's 12-year-old brother. As the siblings are veterans of the foster care system, Joaquin in particular is very anxious to find a good home and feel settled. He and Brianna have their moments of discord, but mainly they look after each other. Overall, he just wants to be loved.
 Terri J. Vaughn as Renee LaToya Smith. A nurse at the hospital where Will, Sasha, Brown, and Derek work. She is a close friend and confidante to Sasha, despite the two constantly butting heads at work. She considers herself as part ghetto. Renee was a recurring character in Season 3 who became a regular in Season 4. She claims to have four kids.
 K Callan as Daisy LaRue. Daisy is a former B-movie actress and "legend in her own mind"; she really misses her career. She has made a lot of money but she's frugal. Whenever someone tries to talk to her about money or anything else she doesn't want to discuss, she "goes into character" to avoid the conversation. She will often act like she believes she is in Manhattan or Los Angeles, etc., rather than Brown Meadows in suburban Atlanta. She never married due to never finding anyone like her high school crush, but she has dated the best of them. In season 3, she moved to Palm Beach, Florida with her cousin Lorraine (the late Rue McClanahan) after she realized that she had Alzheimer's disease, but she made a trip back to attend Edna and Colonel's Season 4 wedding.
 Antonio Jaramillo as Jesus Hernandez. Jesus is a handyman who worked at Brown Meadows to save up for law school; in Season 3, Brown fired him to save money. When he comes back in Season 4 for Edna and Colonel's wedding, he claims that he has become a lawyer and is doing well. He has a love/hate relationship with London.
 Arielle Vandenberg as London Sheraton. London is a very privileged celebrity who is famous for absolutely no reason. Although she has no clue about hard work, she has to do community service at Brown Meadows, due to having several DUIs. She may appear dim but at times she shows almost startling intelligence. In Season 2, her family forces her to move after her probation, but she occasionally visits Brown Meadows, like for Edna and Colonel's Season 4 wedding. She is similar to the character London Tipton from the show The Suite Life of Zack & Cody; both London's are portrayed as dumb, both are heiresses, and both depend on their unseen-but-mentioned fathers (both characters, in turn, are loose parodies of real-life Hilton Worldwide heiress Paris Hilton).
 Jeannette Sousa as Carmen Martinez. Carmen only appears in the early Season 1 episode; she is Brianna and Joaquin's social worker, and Sasha's good friend.
 Maestro Harrell as Antonio. Antonio, Brianna's boyfriend from the foster home was introduced in season 3. In season 4, he dies from organ failure having been injured in a car wreck while texting and driving to a party in the episode "Meet The Big Payoff". He was able to make it to the hospital for treatment believing his injuries to be minor, but things quickly took a turn for the worst.

Recurring characters
 Robert Ri'chard as Derek Porter (seasons 3–5), a Dominican frat student who lives next door to Brown Meadows and often helps out there, in between masterminding or participating in Brown's antics
 Jenifer Lewis as Vera Brown, Mr. Brown's younger sister, and Will's mother
 Tasha Smith as Tanya Ortiz, Joaquin and Brianna's biological mother
 Lisa Arrindell Anderson as Karen, The Colonel's daughter, estranged from her father after putting him in a nursing home after the death of her mother
 Ciara Wilson as Simone Taylor, Brianna's best friend
 Courtney Gray as Jamal, Brianna's male best friend
 Bernard Jones as Milo, a student at Cora's school. He later appeared in Tyler Perry's House of Payne as a college student and friend of Malik.
 Leland L. Jones as Gordon Bob, Cora's ex-love interest from college and the principal at her school
 Maurice G. Smith as Reggie Brooks, Cora's off-and-on boyfriend, the school's football coach
 Laura Hayes as Mrs. Thelma Brooks, Reggie's mother
 Bill Bellamy as Anthony, Renee's on-and-off boyfriend and Will's best friend who works as a nurse
 Njema Williams as Benny, a local bum who is usually hustling with (or against) Brown

Home releases
Lionsgate Home Entertainment has released all five seasons on DVD in Region 1. But these are arranged differently than the TV broadcast in which the DVD releases make up seven seasons with twenty episodes each.

Ratings
When the series premiered on January 7, 2009, it received a viewership of 4,027,000 based on Nielsen ratings. Meet the Browns was TBS's #1 sitcom in March 2010, with 2.3 million viewers and 1.2 million adults 18-49. In October 2010, the show continued to be TBS's #1 and #2 sitcom telecasts, with an audience of 1.2 to 1.4 million adults 18–49.

Syndication
Meet the Browns began airing in off-network syndication in September 2010 on stations covering more than 70% of the U.S., with major station groups carrying the program including Fox Television Stations, Tribune Broadcasting, Weigel Broadcasting, CBS Television Stations, Capitol Broadcasting Company, Cox Media Group, Meredith Corporation, Granite Broadcasting, Belo Broadcasting. and CW Plus, Reruns are primarily aired on affiliates of MyNetworkTV and The CW (the latter network's CW Plus service also carries the program as part of its national schedule). BET began airing reruns of the series in October 2016.

References

Character bios: TBS.com
Main cast bios: TBS.com

External links
 
 Tyler Perry's "Meet the Browns" on TBS

2009 American television series debuts
2011 American television series endings
2000s American black sitcoms
2010s American black sitcoms
American television spin-offs
English-language television shows
TBS (American TV channel) original programming
 Live action television shows based on films
 Television series based on plays
 Television shows filmed in Atlanta
 Television series by Lionsgate Television
 Television shows set in West Virginia
Meet The Browns
 Television series about families
 Television series by Tyler Perry Studios